The Pakistan Rangers are a pair of paramilitary federal law enforcement corps' in Pakistan. The two corps are the Punjab Rangers (operating in Punjab province with headquarters in Lahore) and the Sindh Rangers (operating in Sindh province with headquarters in Karachi). There is also a third corps headquarters in Islamabad but is only for units transferred from the other corps for duties in the federal capital. They are both part of the Civil Armed Forces. The corps' operate administratively under the Interior Ministry of Pakistan but under separate command structure s and wear distinctly different uniforms. However, they are usually commanded by officers on secondment from the Pakistan Army. They are also often involved in major internal and external security operations with the regular Pakistani military and provide assistance to municipal and provincial police forces to maintain law and order against crime, terrorism and unrest. In addition, the Punjab Rangers, together with the Indian Border Security Force, participate in an elaborate flag lowering ceremony at the Wagah−Attari border crossing east of Lahore.

The mutually-recognized India–Pakistan international border is different from the disputed and heavily militarized Line of Control (LoC), where the Pakistani province of Punjab adjoins Jammu and Kashmir (a conflict territory between India and Pakistan) and the undisputed international border effectively ends. Consequently, the LoC is not managed by the paramilitary Punjab Rangers, but by the regular Pakistan Army.

As part of the paramilitary Civil Armed Forces, the Rangers can be transferred to full operational control of the Pakistan Army in wartime and whenever Article 245 of the Constitution of Pakistan is invoked to provide "military aid to civil power". An example of this is the Sindh Rangers being deployed in Karachi to tackle rising crime and terrorism. Although these deployments are officially temporary because the provincial and federal governments have to allocate policing powers to the corps, they have in effect become permanent because of repeated renewal of those powers.

History
The origins of the Pakistan Rangers go back to 1942, when the British government established a special unit in Sindh known as the Sindh Police Rifles (SPR) which was commanded by British Indian Army officers. The force was established to fight the rebellious groups in sindh as the British government was engaged in World War II. Headquarters of this force was established in Miani Lines Pacca Barrack, Hyderabad Cantonment.

After the independence of Pakistan in 1947, the name of the force was changed from "Sindh Police Rifles" to "Sindh Police Rangers" and the protection of eastern boundaries with India was allotted to various temporary forces, such as the Punjab Border Police Force, Bahawalpur State Police, Khairpur State Police and Sindh Police Rangers.

Because the Rangers were neither correctly structured nor outfitted for a specific duty, on 7 October 1958 they were restructured and renamed to the West Pakistan Rangers. In 1972, following the independence of East Pakistan and Legal Framework Order No. 1970 by the Government of Pakistan, the force was officially renamed from the West Pakistan Rangers to the Pakistan Rangers and put under control of the Ministry of Defence with its headquarters at Lahore.

In 1974, the organization became part of the Civil Armed Forces under the Pakistani Ministry of Interior, where it has remained since.

In late 1989, due to growing riots and the worsening situation of law and order in the province of Sindh, a new force was raised for a strategic anti-dacoit operation. The paramilitary force operated under the name of the Mehran Force and consisted of the then-existing Sindh Rangers, three battalions of the Pakistan Army (including the Northern Scouts). The Mehran Force was under the direct command of the Director-General (DG) of the Pakistan Rangers with its nucleus headquarters in Karachi.

Following these series of events, the federal government decided to substantially increase the strength of the Pakistan Rangers and raise a separate, dedicated headquarters for them in the province of Sindh. On 1 July 1995 the Pakistan Rangers were bifurcated into two distinct forces, the Pakistan Rangers – Punjab (Punjab Rangers) and Pakistan Rangers – Sindh (Sindh Rangers). Consequently, the Mehran Force and other Pakistani paramilitary units operating in the province of Sindh were merged with and began to operate under the Sindh Rangers.

Wartime responsibilities

The West Pakistan Rangers fought alongside the Pakistan Army in several conflicts, namely the Indo-Pakistani War of 1965 and the Indo-Pakistani War of 1971. After the war in 1971 and subsequent independence of Bangladesh, the force was federalized under the Ministry of Defence as the Pakistan Rangers and shortly afterwards in 1974, it was made a component of the Civil Armed Forces (CAF) under the Ministry of Interior. Since then, the Pakistan Rangers are primarily responsible for guarding the border with neighbouring India during times of peace and war. 

The Pakistan Rangers have participated in military exercises with the Pakistan Army's Special Service Group (SSG) and also assisted with military operations in the past since their revitalization and rebuilding after the Indo-Pakistani War of 1971. The first such participation was in 1973, when they operated under the command of the SSG to raid the Iraqi embassy in Islamabad alongside local police. In 1992, the Sindh Rangers saw an extensive deployment throughout Karachi to keep peace in the city in support of the Government of Sindh. The Sindh Provincial Police and Pakistan Rangers were involved in Operation Blue Fox against the MQM with direction from the Pakistan Army. Due to their close association with the military, the Rangers also saw combat against regular Indian troops during the Kargil War of 1999 in Kashmir. In 2007, the Pakistan Rangers alongside regular Pakistani soldiers and SSG commandos participated in Operation Silence against Taliban forces in Islamabad. The conflict started when, after 18 months of tensions between government authorities and Islamist militants, Taliban terrorists attacked the Punjab Rangers guarding the nearby Ministry of Environment building and set it ablaze. Immediately following this event, they proceeded to attack a nearby Pakistani healthcare centre, kidnapping an abundance of Chinese nurses, and subsequently locked themselves inside the Red Mosque with hostages. Two years later, in 2009, the Rangers once again participated in a special military operation in Lahore alongside the SSG, when twelve terrorists operating for the Taliban attacked the Manawan Police Academy in Lahore. The operation ended with eight militants killed and four captured. Later that year, the Government of Pakistan deployed the Punjab Rangers to secure the outskirts of Islamabad when the Taliban had taken over the Buner, Lower Dir, Swat and Shangla districts. Following these incidents, the Rangers participated in the Pakistan Army's Operation Black Thunderstorm.

Role

Aside from the primary objective of guarding the border with India, the Rangers are also responsible for maintaining internal security in Pakistan and serve as a major law enforcement organization in the country. Despite this, they do not possess the power to make arrests like the regular police with the exception of when the state temporarily sanctions them with such an authority in times of extreme crisis. Their primary objective as an internal security force is to prevent and suppress crime by taking preventive security measures, cracking down on criminals and thwarting organized crime with the use of major force. All suspects apprehended by the Rangers during a crackdown are later handed over to police for further investigation and possible prosecution when the chaos is brought under control. The same privileges are also temporarily granted by the government to other security organizations such as the Frontier Corps for the same reasons.

The Rangers are also tasked with securing important monuments and guarding national assets in all major cities, including Islamabad.

In the past, they have also served as prison guards for high-profile terrorists until they were withdrawn from such duties.

The Rangers have notably contributed towards maintaining law and order in Islamabad, Karachi and Lahore in major crises. Due to the developing internal instability in Pakistan, the Rangers have become an extremely necessary force to maintain order throughout the provinces of Sindh and Punjab.

Gallery

See also
 Civil Armed Forces
 National Guard (Pakistan)
 Pakistan Levies

References

External links

Official Web Portal of Pakistan Rangers (Sindh)
Pakistan Rangers (Punjab) "Under Construction"
Pakistan Rangers (Punjab)
The Pakistan Rangers Ordinance, 1959 (W.P. Ordinance XIV of 1959)

Military in Sindh
Military in Punjab, Pakistan
1942 establishments in British India
1959 establishments in Pakistan
Government agencies established in 1942